The 2013 U.S. F2000 Cooper Tires Winterfest was the third year of the winter racing series promoted by the U.S. F2000 National Championship. It consisted of six races held during two race meets in Florida during February 2013 and served as preparation for the 2013 U.S. F2000 National Championship.

American Neil Alberico, in his second year in the series and first with Cape Motorsports w/ Wayne Taylor Racing won five of the six races and captured the championship. His Cape teammate, Canadian Scott Hargrove, won one race and finished second in the other five and was runner-up in the championship. Their teammate James Fletcher had three podium finishes and finished third in points. Canadian James Dayson was the only National class entrant and only contested the first three rounds of the championship. There were no lead changes during any of the six races and the first three races at Sebring International Raceway were run without a caution period.

Drivers and teams

Race calendar and results
The race schedule was announced on October 23, 2012.

Championship standings

Drivers' Championship

Teams'

References

External links
U.S. F2000 National Championship official website

U.S. F2000 National Championship seasons
F2000 Winterfest
U.S. F2000 Winterfest